Cheryl Renee Brown (born February 11, 1944) is an American politician who served in the California State Assembly, representing the 47th Assembly District, encompassing parts of the Inland Empire. She is a Democrat.

In 2016, Brown was defeated in her bid for reelection to a third term by fellow Democrat Eloise Reyes. Prior to being elected to the Assembly, she was a newspaper publisher.

2014 California State Assembly

2016 California State Assembly 
During her first term, Brown voted against climate legislation and accepted a $1 million expenditure from Chevron on her behalf. In response, the progressive group California Donor Table sought to unseat her by supporting Eloise Reyes.

References

External links 
 Campaign website
 Join California Cheryl Brown

Democratic Party members of the California State Assembly
Living people
1944 births
African-American state legislators in California
African-American women in politics
Women state legislators in California
California State University, San Bernardino alumni
People from Rialto, California
21st-century American politicians
21st-century American women politicians
21st-century African-American women
21st-century African-American politicians
20th-century African-American people
20th-century African-American women